Shirley M. Kitchen (born September 18, 1946) is an American politician from Pennsylvania who served as a Democratic member of the Pennsylvania House of Representatives for the 181st district from 1987 through 1988 and the Pennsylvania State Senate for the 3rd District from 1996 to 2016.  She is the second African-American woman to serve in the Pennsylvania Senate.

Early life and education
Kitchen was born in Augusta, Georgia. She graduated from Antioch University in 1979 with a bachelor's degree in Human Services and attended Temple University. She received certificates in Child Care, Behavior Modification and Economic Development from Temple.

Career
She worked as a poll worker in the City of Philadelphia from 1970 to 1976, as a social worker for the County of Philadelphia and as the Director of Constituent Services for the Philadelphia City Council from 1986 to 1987.

She was elected to the Pennsylvania House of Representatives, District 181 in November 1987 and served through 1988.  She was elected to the Pennsylvania State Senate for the 3rd district in November 1996 in a special election to succeed Roxanne Jones who died in office.  She served until November 2016 when she retired from the Pennsylvania State Senate.  She was the second African-American woman to serve in the Pennsylvania State Senate and at the time of her retirement, was the only African-American woman member of the Senate.

She worked as the Manager for the Management Information Systems Department of the Philadelphia Parking Authority from 1990 to 1992 and as Director of Constituent Services for the Philadelphia City Council from 1992 to 1996.

Ward leader 
Kitchen is the Ward Leader of the 20th Ward Democratic Executive Committee.

2015 Legislative Action 
Throughout 2015, she worked in the following committees:
 Public Health and Welfare
 Agricultural and Rural Affairs
 Transportation
 Urban Affairs and Housing

References

External links
Senator Kitchen official Caucus website
Pennsylvania State Senate - Shirley M. Kitchen official PA Senate website
Project Vote Smart - Senator Shirley M. Kitchen (PA) profile
Follow the Money - Shirley M. Kitchen
2006, 2004, 2002, and 2000 campaign contributions

1946 births
20th-century American women politicians
20th-century American politicians
21st-century American women politicians
21st-century American politicians
African-American state legislators in Pennsylvania
African-American women in politics
Antioch University alumni
Living people
Members of the Pennsylvania House of Representatives
Pennsylvania state senators
Politicians from Augusta, Georgia
Politicians from Philadelphia
Temple University alumni
Women state legislators in Pennsylvania
20th-century African-American women
20th-century African-American politicians
21st-century African-American women
21st-century African-American politicians